These are the full results of the 1998 European Cup Super League in athletics which was held on 27 and 28 June 1998 at the Petrovsky Stadium in St. Petersburg, Russia.

Team standings

Men's results

100 metres
27 JuneWind: -0.4 m/s

200 metres
28 JuneWind: +1.4 m/s

400 metres
27 June

800 metres
28 June

1500 metres
27 June

3000 metres
27 June

5000 metres
28 June

110 metres hurdles
28 JuneWind: 0.0 m/s

400 metres hurdles
27 June

3000 metres steeplechase
28 June

4 × 100 metres relay
27 June

4 × 400 metres relay
28 June

High jump
27 June

Pole vault
28 June

Long jump
27 June

Triple jump
28 June

Shot put
27 June

Discus throw
28 June

Hammer throw
28 June

Javelin throw
28 June

Women's results

100 metres
27 JuneWind: +1.2 m/s

200 metres
28 JuneWind: -0.9 m/s

400 metres
27 June

800 metres
27 June

1500 metres
28 June

3000 metres
28 June

5000 metres
27 June

100 metres hurdles
28 JuneWind: 0.0 m/s

400 metres hurdles
27 June

4 × 100 metres relay
27 June

4 × 400 metres relay
28 June

High jump
28 June

Pole vault
27 June

Long jump
28 June

Triple jump
27 June

Shot put
28 June

Discus throw
27 June

Hammer throw
27 June

Javelin throw
27 June

References

European Cup Super League
European
1998 in Russian sport
International athletics competitions hosted by Russia
Sports competitions in Saint Petersburg